Pariz District is a district (bakhsh) in Sirjan County, Kerman Province, Iran. At the 2006 census, its population was 13,382, in 3,358 families.  The district has one city: Pariz. The district has two rural districts (dehestan): Pariz Rural District and Saadatabad Rural District.

References 

Sirjan County
Districts of Kerman Province